Omro is the name of several places in the United States:

 Omro Township, Minnesota
 Omro, Wisconsin
 Omro (town), Wisconsin